The Johor Art Gallery is an art gallery in Johor Bahru, Johor, Malaysia.

History
The art gallery building was built in 1910. The building at once became the base for the Japanese Imperial Army during the Japanese occupation of Malaya. The building used to be the official residence of the Chief Minister of Johor Abdullah Jaafar. Afterwards, the Johor State Government decided to preserve the building by turning it into an art gallery and thus the Johor Art Gallery was opened on 29 January 1994 by Chief Minister Muhyiddin Yassin. In 2000–2003, it was closed for renovation and reopened again on 6 May 2003 by Chief Minister Abdul Ghani Othman.

Architecture
The art gallery is a 2-story building located on top of a small green hill.

Exhibitions
When opened in 1994, the gallery used to display historical artifacts about arts and cultures of Johor. After its reopening in 2003, it became the center for arts and cultures. The exhibition area is divided into the permanent and temporary exhibition areas. Besides temporary exhibitions, the art gallery also regularly holds various competitions as well.

Opening time
The building is now closed and appears abandoned.

See also
 List of tourist attractions in Johor

References

External links
 

1994 establishments in Malaysia
Art museums and galleries in Johor
Buildings and structures in Johor Bahru